Citrus County Transit is the public transportation agency that serves Citrus County, Florida.

The service provides on-demand service on Monday-Friday and operates the Orange Route, a fixed route which connects Beverly Hills, Homosassa, Lecanto and Inverness, on Monday-Friday.

External links
 Citrus County Transit Official Website

Bus transportation in Florida
Transportation in Citrus County, Florida